The 2015 Bucharest Trophy was the second edition of the Bucharest Trophy held in Bucharest, Romania from 21 to 24 August as a pre-season international women's team handball tournament for clubs. The most recent runners-up of the EHF Champions League edition (Larvik HK) have been also invited but withdrew before making a debut due to season's fixtures. 

The whole tournament was aired on Digi Sport 1, Digi Sport 2 and Digi Sport 3.

Participants
  CSM Bucharest (hosts & 2014 Bucharest Trophy winners)
  ŽRK Budućnost (2014–15 EHF Champions League winners)
  HCM Baia Mare 
  ŽRK Vardar (2014–15 EHF Champions League bronze medalists)
  Rostov-Don (2014–15 EHF Cup finalists)
  Corona Brașov

Results

Group stage

Group A

Group B

Knockout stages

5th place game

3rd place game

Final

Awards

Team of the Tournament
Goalkeeper: 
Left wing:   
Left back:   
Playmaker:   
Pivot:   
Right back: 
Right wing:

Special awards
Top Scorer:   
Most Valuable Player: 
Best Defender:   
Fair Play Award:

References

External links 

 

Bucharest Trophy
2015 in handball
2015 in Romanian sport
Sport in Bucharest
Bucharest Trophy